Alexis Copello (born August 12, 1985) is a Cuban triple jumper who since 2017 competes internationally for Azerbaijan. He is a World Championship medalist, having won the bronze at the 2009 World Championships in Athletics. He is 1.85 metres (6 ft 1 in) tall and weighs 80 kilograms (176 lbs).

His international career began with success at regional level: he won a silver medal in the triple jump at the 2006 Central American and Caribbean Games and a bronze medal at the 2008 Central American and Caribbean Championships. Copello represented Cuba at the 2008 Summer Olympics in Beijing.

He won the gold at the 2009 Central American and Caribbean Championships and set a championship record of 17.33 m.

On 30 March 2017, he officially switched his allegiance to Azerbaijan.

Personal bests

Competition record

See also
Cuba at the 2008 Summer Olympics

References

External links

Tilastopaja biography
Ecured biography (in Spanish)

1985 births
Living people
Sportspeople from Santiago de Cuba
Cuban male triple jumpers
Azerbaijani male triple jumpers
Athletes (track and field) at the 2008 Summer Olympics
Athletes (track and field) at the 2012 Summer Olympics
Athletes (track and field) at the 2016 Summer Olympics
Athletes (track and field) at the 2011 Pan American Games
Olympic athletes of Cuba
World Athletics Championships medalists
Pan American Games gold medalists for Cuba
Pan American Games medalists in athletics (track and field)
Defecting sportspeople of Cuba
Naturalized citizens of Azerbaijan
Central American and Caribbean Games silver medalists for Cuba
Competitors at the 2006 Central American and Caribbean Games
Central American and Caribbean Games medalists in athletics
Medalists at the 2011 Pan American Games
Islamic Solidarity Games competitors for Azerbaijan